Gary Graffman (born October 14, 1928) is an American classical pianist, teacher and administrator.

Early life
Graffman was born in New York City to Russian-Jewish parents. Having started piano at age 3, Graffman entered the Curtis Institute of Music at age 7 in 1936 as a piano student of Isabelle Vengerova. After graduating from Curtis in 1946, he made his professional solo debut with conductor Eugene Ormandy and the Philadelphia Orchestra. From 1946 to 1948, he studied at Columbia University. In 1949, Graffman won the Leventritt Competition. He then furthered his piano studies with Rudolf Serkin at the Marlboro Music Festival and informally with Vladimir Horowitz. In 1954, he returned to Columbia to perform Edward MacDowell's Piano Concerto No. 2 under Leopold Stokowski at the university's bicentennial concert.

Initial work
Upon graduation he played with numerous orchestras and performed concerts and recitals internationally. Over the next three decades, he toured and recorded extensively, performing solo and with orchestras around the globe. In 1964, he recorded Sergei Rachmaninoff's Rhapsody on a Theme of Paganini with Leonard Bernstein conducting the New York Philharmonic. He also made a classic recording of Sergei Prokofiev's Third Piano Concerto with George Szell and the Cleveland Orchestra in 1966; it was reissued on CD as part of Sony Classical's "Great Performances" series in 2006.

Probably Graffman's best known recorded performance was for the soundtrack of the 1979 Woody Allen movie Manhattan in which he played George Gershwin's Rhapsody In Blue, accompanied by the New York Philharmonic. Portions of the Philharmonic/Graffman version have been featured countless times in TV and movies over the last quarter century.

Injury
In 1977, he sprained the ring finger of his right hand. Because of this injury he began re-fingering some passages for that hand in such a way as to avoid using the affected finger. This altered technique appeared to aggravate the problem, ultimately forcing him to stop performing with his right hand altogether by around 1979. Thereafter, Graffman pursued his other interests such as writing, photography, and Oriental art. In 1980, he joined the faculty at the Curtis Institute of Music, where his career had begun. He took over as the school's director in 1986, and added the title of President in 1995, serving in both capacities through May 2006. He has also served on the piano faculty of the Manhattan School of Music.

Graffman's finger sprain may have been a trigger for focal dystonia, a neurological disorder that causes loss of function and uncontrollable curling in the fingers. The pianist Leon Fleisher, a close friend of Graffman, also had the disorder.

Later career
Shortly after joining the Curtis faculty, he published a memoir, I Really Should Be Practicing.

In 1985 he gave the UK premiere of Erich Wolfgang Korngold's Piano Concerto in C-sharp for the Left Hand. Paul Wittgenstein had commissioned the work in the 1920s and played it many times, but it later slipped from the repertoire.

Seven left-hand works have been commissioned for Graffman. In 1993, for example, he performed the world premiere of Ned Rorem's Piano Concerto No. 4, written specifically for the left hand, and in 2001 he premiered Daron Hagen's concerto Seven Last Words. The American composer William Bolcom composed Gaea, a concerto for two pianos left hand for Graffman and Leon Fleisher. It received its first performance in Baltimore in April 1996. The concerto is constructed in such a way that it can be performed in one of three ways, with either piano part alone with reduced orchestra, or with both piano parts and the two reduced orchestras combined into a full orchestra.

Honors
Graffman has received honorary doctoral degrees, was honored by the cities of Philadelphia and New York, and received the Governor's Arts Award by the Commonwealth of Pennsylvania. His students include pianists Lydia Artymiw, Lang Lang, Yuja Wang, Haochen Zhang and Szu-Yu Su.

References

Further reading
 
 Graffman, Gary (1982). I Really Should Be Practicing. New York: Avon.

External links

Gary Graffman collection, International Piano Archives at Maryland, University of Maryland Libraries.

1928 births
Living people
20th-century American Jews
20th-century American male musicians
20th-century classical pianists
21st-century American Jews
21st-century American male musicians
21st-century classical pianists
American classical pianists
American male classical pianists
American music educators
American people of Russian-Jewish descent
Classical musicians from New York (state)
Classical musicians from Pennsylvania
Classical pianists who played with one arm
Curtis Institute of Music alumni
Columbia College (New York) alumni
Curtis Institute of Music faculty
Educators from New York City
Educators from Philadelphia
Jewish American classical musicians
Jewish classical pianists
Leventritt Award winners
Manhattan School of Music faculty
Musicians from New York City
Musicians from Philadelphia
Musicians with dystonia
Fulbright alumni